Olli is a children's book character.

Olli may also refer to:

People with the surname
Egil Olli (born 1949), Norwegian politician for the Labour Party
Harri Olli (born 1985), Finnish ski jumper who has been competing since 2002
Simo-Pekka Olli (born 1985), professional volleyball player from Finland

People with the given name
Olli Harder, New Zealand association football coach and former player
Olli Huttunen (born 1960), Finnish football coach and former goalkeeper
Olli Huttunen (biathlete) (1915–1940), Finnish skier
Olli Jokinen (born 1978), Finnish professional ice hockey player
Olli Kanervisto (1958–1984), Finnish shot putter
Olli Kinkkonen (1881–1918), Finnish American working man lynched in Duluth
Olli Kolehmainen (born 1967), Finnish sprint canoeist
Olli Kortekangas (born 1955), Finnish composer from Turku
Olli Kunnari (born 1982), Finnish volleyball player
Olli Lounasmaa (1930–2002), Finnish academician, experimental physicist and neuroscientist
Olli Määttä (born 1994), Finnish professional ice hockey defenseman
Olli Malmivaara (born 1982), Finnish professional ice hockey defenceman
Olli Mannermaa (1921–1998), Finnish interior architect
Olli Muotka (born 1988), Finnish ski jumper and former Nordic combined athlete
Olli Mustonen (born 1967), Finnish pianist, conductor and composer
Olli Partanen (1922–2014), Finnish former discus thrower
Olli Puhakka (1916–1989), one of the top scoring aces in the Finnish Air Force
Olli Rahnasto (born 1965), retired professional tennis player from Finland
Olli Rehn (born 1962), Finnish politician, currently European Commissioner for Economic and Financial Affairs
Olli Remes (1909–1942), Finnish cross country skier and military officer
Olli Saarela (born 1965), Finnish film director
Olli Tukiainen, a Finnish musician and the guitarist of the rock band Poets of the Fall
Olli Tuominen (born 1979), professional squash player who represented Finland
Olli Ungvere (1906–1991), Estonian actress and singer
Olli Vänskä (born 1981), Finnish violinist of Folk metal band Turisas
Olli Wisdom, British music artist, currently residing in London
Olli-Markus Taivainen (born 1989), Finnish ski-orienteering competitor and World Champion
Olli-Matti Multamäki (1948–2007), commander of the Finnish Army
Olli-Pekka Kallasvuo (born 1953), president and chief executive officer of Nokia Corporation
Olli-Pekka Karjalainen (born 1980), Finnish hammer thrower
Olli-Pekka Ojansivu (born 1988), Finland professional volleyball player

Other uses
Osher Lifelong Learning Institutes
Olli, an autonomous shuttle bus made by Local Motors
OlliOlli, a skateboarding video game

See also
Ollie (skateboarding)

Finnish masculine given names